Holyoke Cottage is a historic home located at Sandy Creek in Oswego County, New York.  It was built in 1905–1906 and is a -story bungalow–style summer residence located on a promontory overlooking North Pond.  Also on the property is a pump house and dry-laid fieldstone wall.

It was listed on the National Register of Historic Places in 1988.

References

Houses on the National Register of Historic Places in New York (state)
Houses completed in 1906
Bungalow architecture in New York (state)
Houses in Oswego County, New York
National Register of Historic Places in Oswego County, New York
1906 establishments in New York (state)